The 2011–12 Oral Roberts Golden Eagles men's basketball team represented Oral Roberts University during the 2011–12 NCAA Division I men's basketball season. The Golden Eagles, led by 13th year head coach Scott Sutton, played their home games at the Mabee Center and are members of The Summit League. This was their last season as a member of The Summit League before joining the Southland Conference in 2012–13 (they rejoined the Summit League in 2014–15). They finished the season 27–7, 17–1 in Summit League play to be crowned regular season champions. They lost in the semifinals of The Summit League Basketball tournament to Western Illinois. As regular season conference champions, they received an automatic bid into the 2012 National Invitation Tournament where they lost in the first round to Nevada.

Roster

Schedule

|-
!colspan=9 style=| Exhibition

|-
!colspan=9 style=| Regular season

|-
!colspan=9 style=| Summit League tournament

|-
!colspan=9 style=| NIT

References

Oral Roberts Golden Eagles men's basketball seasons
Oral Roberts
Oral Roberts
2011 in sports in Oklahoma
2012 in sports in Oklahoma